Lukok is a village in the Kubang Putih region of Agam Regency, West Sumatra, Indonesia.

Lukok is an agricultural village with many rice fields and unirrigated agricultural fields. It is known for its bolu bulung, rakik, and karak kaliang. Besides agriculture, the village's residents are employed as merchants.

Due to its proximity to Mount Marapi, Lukok has a cool climate and many trees.

Lukok celebrates the festival of Khatam Quran, usually held once every two years. The celebration involves dressing in traditional garb, parades, and games.

Populated places in West Sumatra